Dustin M. Johnson (born September 30, 1976) is an American politician serving as the U.S. representative for South Dakota's at-large congressional district since 2019. A member of the Republican Party, he served as South Dakota Public Utilities Commissioner from 2005 to 2011, when he was appointed chief of staff to Governor Dennis Daugaard, a position he held until 2014. Between his state political career and congressional service, Johnson was the vice president of Vantage Point Solutions in Mitchell, South Dakota.

Early life and education
Johnson was born in Pierre, South Dakota. He graduated from T.F. Riggs High School in 1995. He graduated from the University of South Dakota with Omicron Delta Kappa honors with a B.A. in political science in 1999, and was a member of fraternity Phi Delta Theta. He earned his M.P.A. from University of Kansas in 2002. In 1998, Johnson was named a Truman Scholar. As a Truman Scholar, he worked for the U.S. Department of Agriculture in Washington, D.C. In 2003, Johnson worked as a senior policy advisor for then-South Dakota Governor Mike Rounds.

State government career

Public Utilities Commission (2004–2011)
In 2004, Johnson was elected to the South Dakota Public Utilities Commission. He was the youngest utilities commissioner in the nation. In 2010, he won reelection. Johnson also served on the National Association of Regulatory Utility Commissioners' executive board. He was appointed chair of the South Dakota Public Utilities Commission in 2007, and he served in that capacity until his resignation in 2011. In 2010, he led a South Dakota delegation that included then-Governor Rounds and state regulators that met with FCC Commissioners about concerns over the FCC's National Broadband Plan and its impact on small and rural providers in South Dakota.

Daugaard administration (2011–2014)
In 2011, he resigned his PUC position to become Governor Dennis Daugaard's chief of staff, a position he held for four years. As chief operating officer for much of state government, he supervised cabinet secretaries, policy advisors and many of Daugaard's projects and initiatives.

Private sector career (2014–2018)
In 2014, Johnson resigned as chief of staff, leaving the public sector to work for Vantage Point Solutions in Mitchell, South Dakota. Fellow Truman Scholar Tony Venhuizen succeeded Johnson as Daugaard's chief of staff. Johnson resigned his position with Vantage Point Solutions in 2018 upon his accession to Congress.

U.S. House of Representatives

Elections

2018 

The announcement came shortly after Kristi Noem announced she would not seek reelection to Congress in order to run in the 2018 South Dakota gubernatorial election. Johnson defeated Secretary of State of South Dakota Shantel Krebs and State Senator Neal Tapio in the June 5 Republican primary. He defeated Democratic nominee Tim Bjorkman, a retired circuit court judge, and two minor candidates in the November general election.

2020 

On February 19, 2020, Johnson announced his bid for reelection to the House. On February 4, 2020, former state representative Liz Marty May announced she would challenge Johnson in the Republican primary.

Two Democrats, Brian Wirth of Dell Rapids and Whitney Raver of Custer, announced their candidacy for the House seat, but neither got the required number of signatures to make the ballot. According to state party chairman Randy Seiler, Wirth and Raver's canvassing efforts were hampered by the COVID-19 pandemic. On June 2, Johnson won the Republican primary, 77%–23%. He won the general election with 81% of the vote.

2022 

On October 12, 2021, State Representative Taffy Howard announced that she would challenge Johnson in the Republican primary. On June 7, 2022, Johnson defeated Howard, 59%–40%.

Tenure
Johnson was sworn into the U.S. House of Representatives on January 3, 2019, and joined the Problem Solvers Caucus soon after.

Antitrust
In 2022, Johnson was one of 39 Republicans to vote for the Merger Filing Fee Modernization Act of 2022, an antitrust package that would crack down on corporations for anti-competitive behavior.

Border wall
On March 26, 2019, Johnson was one of 14 Republicans to vote with all House Democrats to override President Trump's veto of a measure revoking Trump's declaration of a national emergency at the southern border.

January 6 commission
On May 19, 2021, Johnson was one of 35 Republicans who joined all Democrats in voting to approve legislation to establish the January 6, 2021 commission meant to investigate the storming of the U.S. Capitol.

Liz Cheney
During the second vote to oust Liz Cheney, Johnson was among the few House Republicans who voted to keep her as conference chair.

Committee assignments
Committee on Education and Labor
Subcommittee on Civil Rights and Human Services
Subcommittee on Health, Employment, Labor, and Pensions
Committee on Agriculture
Subcommittee on Nutrition, Oversight, and Department Operations
Subcommittee on Commodity Exchanges, Energy, and Credit

Caucus memberships 

 Republican Main Street Partnership
Problem Solvers Caucus
 Congressional Coalition on Adoption

Electoral history

Personal life

Johnson has been actively involved as a state advisor for South Dakota Teen Age Republicans (TARs) and its Black Hills camp leader since 2004. He serves on the board of directors for the W.O. Farber Fund, Abbott House, and on the South Dakota Attorney General's Open Government Task Force. Johnson has served as an adjunct professor at Dakota Wesleyan University.

References

External links

 Congressman Dusty Johnson official U.S. House website
Dusty Johnson for Congress

|-

1976 births
Dakota Wesleyan University faculty
Living people
People from Mitchell, South Dakota
People from Pierre, South Dakota
Republican Party members of the United States House of Representatives from South Dakota
University of Kansas alumni
University of South Dakota alumni
21st-century American politicians
Chiefs of staff to United States state governors